Pashto is an Eastern Iranian language, spoken by the Pashtun tribes in Pakistan and Afghanistan.

Pashto or Poshtu may also refer to:
 Poshtu, Bushehr, a village in Bushehr Province, Iran
 Poshtu, Hormozgan, a village in Hormozgan Province, Iran
 Pashto, Battagram, a union council town in Battagram District, Khyber Pakhtunkhwa, Pakistan

See also
 Pathan (disambiguation)
 Pashto alphabet
 Pashto grammar
 Pashto literature and poetry
 Pashto media
 Pashto music
 Pashtuns
 Pashtunwali